The Bakharwal dog is found in northern India. It is an ancient working Indian dog breed found in Ladakh and across the Pir Panjal Range of India, where it has been bred for many centuries by the Bakarwal Gujjar nomadic tribe as a livestock guardian dog and settlement protector. While the Bakharwal Dog is mainly found in India, it is found in smaller numbers in Afghanistan and Pakistan.

A recent study says that this breed is on the verge of extinction and Bakerwal community has appealed to include this animal in the endangered species category. Of late, there were many cases when this mountain breed of dog contracted rabies or was shot by separatist militants.

History

The origin of the Bakharwal Dog lies in Ladakh, northern India, and found  in the states of Jammu and Kashmir and Himachal Pradesh. It has been bred by the Gujjar and Bakerwal castes, as well as other local people of Jammu and Kashmir and Himachal Pradesh, for the purpose of guarding their flocks of goats, sheep and cattle, along with their houses, from centuries. The Bakharwal Dog may be descended from crossbreeding the Tibetan Mastiff with the Indian pariah dog, though other scholars state that the Bakharwal Dog is the "oldest Indian Dog which since centuries has been surviving with the Gujjar tribe."

The Bakharwal Dog has been targeted by separatist militants in the erstwhile Indian state of Jammu and Kashmir, who shot the dogs to prevent them from alerting people of their intrusion. These separatist militants prevented herdsmen from going to higher reaches, which caused many Bakharwal Dogs to catch disease and die.

While the Bakharwal Dog is mainly found in India, it is found in smaller numbers in Afghanistan and Pakistan.

General appearance

Bakarwal is divided into two categories namely general Bakarwal and Ladakhi Bakarwal. Bakarwal is a powerful, heavy bone, medium to large size dog. It is an agile and a sturdy breed, a typical mountain dog with a furry coat and plumy tail that gives it a majestic look. It looks like a medium version of Tibetan Mastiff. It is mostly in black colour with white at toes and chest. The dog has a vegetarian appetite that mainly includes bread made of rice chaff, maize and milk. Common colours are black and tan, red, fawn, pied, sable, white and brindle.

Females of the particular breed give birth to a single litter once a year, with the average size being three to four puppies.

Utilisation
The Bakharwal Dog, along with the Gaddi Kutta, is particularly used for guarding sheep, protecting farms and homes in Himachal Pradesh as well as in Jammu and Kashmir. It is also used by the Indian Police in order to capture militants across the nation.

Bakharwal Dogs, the mountain dogs are an ancient breed of working dogs found in the state of Jammu and Kashmir. Scientists believe that these may be amongst the oldest herding dogs having origins in Central Asia. They are bred by nomadic tribes as a livestock guardian dog and settlement protector. Bakharwal Dog puppies between 8 and twelve weeks old need four meals daily. Bakharwal Dog puppies 3 to 6 months old should be fed 3 meals in a 24-hour period. Top-quality dry dog food ensures balanced nutrition to adult bakharwal dogs and may be mixed with water, canned food. Bakharwal Dogs must get some daily exercise to stay fit, recharge their brains, and maintain their health. Daily activity also really helps bakharwal dogs fight boredom, which often has the potential to lead to difficult behaviour.

See also
 Dogs portal
 List of dog breeds
 List of dog breeds from India
 Bakharwal Dog History and Insight

References

Dog breeds originating in India
Livestock guardian dogs